Gennady Katsov (born February 13, 1956 Evpatoria, Ukrainian SSR, USSR) is a Soviet Russian-American poet, writer and journalist from Ukraine.

Early life
He was born and raised in Evpatoria, Crimean peninsula in Ukraine. He graduated from the Shipbuilding Institute at Nikolaev, now known as Mykolaiv, and worked in the department of the Chief Designer at the Kherson Shipyard. Later, he graduated from the All-Union Correspondence University of Public Knowledge with a two-year degree in journalism. During his second year of studies, he became interested in the fine arts and visited both Moscow and Leningrad. During a visit to the Hermitage, he decided that he would learn more about art history.

Career
In the early 1980s Gennady Katsov moved to Moscow and became close to Ivan Zhdanov who introduced him to many artists including Lesha Parshchikov, Sasha Eremenko,, Konstantin Kedrov, Dmitri Prigov, who is one of the founders of Russian conceptualism, and Sergey Letov, who is an older brother of Yegor Letov the founder of Grazhdanskaya Oborona (Civil Defense). In 1986, Katsov was one of the founders of the legendary Moscow Poetry Club and from 1987 to 1989 served as its director, as well as an active participant of the Epsilon salon, a famous Moscow underground literary group.

Novels by Gennady Katsov were published in the journal "Mitin" (MZh); his articles, short stories, plays and poems were published in the anthology "Chernovik" (New York) (Draft), and a selection of his poems was included in the first issue of the literary magazine "Khreschatyk" (Kiev), which is one of the most prominent Russian-language literary magazines published outside of Russia.

In Leningrad, Katsov was close to Alexander Kahn (born 1954 Kherson), a 1970s graduate of the faculty of foreign languages at Tula State University who spoke English fluently and founded the Leningrad Jazz Club Kvadrat. In 1984 during peristroika, Kahn, who had been a writer for both Billboard and Coda, gave many visitors tours of Leningrad where Katsov became immersed in the music scene.
 
On May 12, 1989, Gennady Katsov moved to New York after living in Austria and Italy. He worked as a concierge at the Le Parker Meridien from 1989 to 1995.

From 1989 to 1991, Katsov, along  with Sergei Dovlatov and Alexander Genis worked at the Radio Liberty, where he produced segments on modern culture in Peter Weil's program entitled Above the Barriers. Gennady was regularly published in the daily newspaper The New Russian Word, as well as in Russian-American literary almanac Slovo \ Word.
 
He left his concierge job in 1995 and in 1995-1997 Katsov was a founder and co-owner of Russian avant-garde café «Anyway» in Manhattan opening it the week before Halloween in 1995.

He was the publisher and the editor-in-chief of a weekly Russian language newspaper The Printed Organ in New York (1994-1998), the editor-in-chief of the Guide to New York (issued quarterly, 1997–1998), the weekly magazine Telenedelya (2000-2004), as well as the weekly Russian-language magazine МЕТРО (pronounced "metro") (February 2004 – 2007), a weekly New York Russian-language magazine covering greater New York City cultural events.

He had a prominent role in the weekly TV segment New York: history and geography in Dmitry Poletaev's program of Good Evening, America! (Nationwide television EABC, New York, 1997–1999), a weekly hour radio "Morning Solyanka" on Russian-American radio RTN / WMNB (1998-2000), served as editor-in- chief for RTN / WMNB radio (2000-2003).
 
Since 2000 Gennady Katsov authors and anchors the daily political and economic 30-minute TV program  entitled Not a Day Without a Line - an overview of the American press on Russian-American television RTN / WMNB. Starting in 2003 Gennady is the author and a host of the daily TV program A Morning Run, as well and the Sunday program Press Club aired on the same channel.
 
As of 2010 –  Gennady Katsov is the owner and an editor-in-chief of the Russian-American Internet news portal RUNYweb.com, which includes the Encyclopedia of Russian America. Gennady periodically takes part in the BBC's program the Fifth Floor.
 
In 2011, after a nearly an eighteen-year hiatus, Gennady got back to his poetic activities. After that seven more books of Gennady Katsov have been published: "Between the Ceiling and the Floor" (New York) in 2013, "365 Days around the Sun" (New York) in 2014, "Youth Exercises (1983-1985)" in 2014, "25 years with the right to correspondence" (Moscow) in 2014,  "Three “Cs” and Vers librarium" (New York) in 2015, "New York primer" (Moscow) in 2018, "On the Western Front" (Moscow) in 2021. All - poetry collections in Russian.

In 2014, ForumDaily nominated him for the Person of the Year by Russian-speaking America in the category “For Outstanding Achievements in the Media” as the outstanding representative of radio, television and the press, working in both Russian-language and English-language media.

Personal
He and his wife Rika live in New York.

Notes

References

External links 
 Gennady Katsov in Russian
 English translations of 4 ekphrastic poems of Gennady Katsov by Alex Cigale in Painters and Poets
 English translations of 2 ekphrastic poems of Gennady Katsov by Alex Cigale in Verse Junkies
 Gennady Katsov's Poems Translated By Alex Cigale. Blue Lyra Review Volume 2: an anthology of diverse voices
 Two of Gennady Katsov's poems, "To One Born in Crimea" and "For the 25th Anniversary of My Arrival in America" translated by Alex Cigale. Issue 7 of Tupelo Quarterly, "Pilgrimage, Voyage, & Return"
 Gennady Katsov: Ekphrastic Poems Translated By Alex Cigale. Life and Legends (USA) Third Edition, 2015
 The Yellow Kite, by Gennady Katsov, translated by Nina Kossman. The Ekphrastic Review, 2021

1956 births
Living people
Ukrainian poets
Ukrainian journalists
Russian male poets
Russian journalists
Soviet emigrants to the United States
American writers of Russian descent
Writers from Moscow